The 2021 Ghana Women's FA Cup is the 3rd edition of the Ghana Women's FA Cup, the women's knockout football competition of Ghana. The defending champions are Prisons Ladies who won the trophy in 2017.

Hasaacas Ladies were crowned champions after beating Ampem Darkoa FC 2–0 in the final.

History 
Due to the shortcomings within the Ghana Football Association arriving due to the dissolution of the GFA in June 2018, as a result of the Anas Number 12 Expose and the COVID-19 pandemic, the FA Cup has not been fully organised since 2017 until 2021.

Sponsorship 
In June 2021, Electroland Ghana Ltd, distributors of NASCO electronic appliances and sponsors of the Player of the Match award for the Women’s Premier League extended their sponsorship package to the Women’s FA Cup competition. The players who were adjudged as best players from the Round of 16 and Quarter-finals of the Women’s FA Cup competition received a NASCO Hand dryer and a sleek NASCO Mobile Phone each. The best players from the Semi-finals and the Final game were also entitled to products from NASCO.

Format 
A total of 32 Clubs consisting of 16 Premier League clubs, 16 Division One League clubs from the Regional Football Associations will participate in the 2021 edition competition.

The preliminary round stage , which is the round of 32 of the cup would be played between the both 16 Premier League and 16 Division One clubs across the country. At the round of 32 stage, the clubs were grouped on zonal basis to reduce travelling time, cost and facilitate more local derbies. The Preliminary stage of the competition was played between14 May to 16 May 2021. The Winners of the preliminary round progressed to the round of 16 with a new draw set to be done.

The round of 16 matches are set to be played between 21 –23 May 2021.

Preliminary Round 
The draw for the preliminary round (round of 32) was made on 10 May 2021. Matches for this round were scheduled for the weekend of 14 May 2021.

The round featured 16 teams from the Women's Premier League (level 1) and 16 teams from the Women's Division Two League (level 2).

Southern Zone

Zone 1

Zone 2

Northern Zone

Zone 1

Zone 2

Zone 3

Round of 16 
The round of 16 draw was to held on 18 April 2021. Matches for this round were scheduled for the weekend of 22-23 May 2021.

The round featured 14 teams from the Women's Premier League (level 1) and two teams from the Women's Division Two League.

Southern Zone

Northern Zone

Quarter-finals 
The draw of the quarter final was held on 4 June 2021 in the studio of StarTimes Adepa channel 247 and Max TV. Four matches were expected to be played at this stage and the balloting was done having teams in the Northern and Southern zone put together in one pot. Teams in both Northern and Southern zones had the opportunity to play against each other respectively. Matches for this round were scheduled for the weekend of 11-14 June 2021.

The round featured eight teams from the Women's Premier League (level 1).

Semi-finals 
The draw for the semi-finals was held on 21 March 2021, in the studio of StarTimes Adepa channel 247 and Max TV.  The four winners from the quarter-finals played in two ties played on the weekend of 19–20 June 2021.

The round featured four teams from the Women's Premier League (level 1).

Final

Annual awards 
The annual awards were given at the end final match

See also 

 2020–21 Ghana Women's Premier League
 2021 Ghanaian FA Cup

References

External links 

 

Football competitions in Ghana
Women's football competitions in Ghana
Ghana Women's FA Cup
2021 in Ghanaian sport
2020–21 African domestic association football cups
2020–21 in Ghanaian football